Nicola Dolapchieff was a Bulgarian-American lawyer and professor of criminal law.

Biography
Dolapchieff was born on February 7, 1897, in the Sliven city (Bulgaria). He was the dean of the Law School and Professor of Criminal Law at the University of Sofia, Bulgaria, and editor of the journal, Jridicheska Measul, (Juridical Thought), published by the Ministry of Justice.

In 1957, Dolapchieff went aboard the Queen Mary from Liverpool to New York City with his wife Rada and his son George. He settled with his family in Los Angeles, California. Deprived of Bulgarian citizenship, he applied for and received US citizenship. He died on November 8, 1964, and was buried in the cemetery Forest Lawn Memorial Park (Hollywood Hills) in Los Angeles.

Bibliography
 The civil action before the criminal court, (Sophia,  1921)
 Die  logishe Aufbau des Schuldbegriffs irri Strafrechtssystem (Berlin,  1924)
 Illegality and Culpability (Sofia, 1925) (44 Penal Law in Soviet Russia (1926)
 The Crime, Act and Causation (1927)
 Handbook of  Bulgarian Criminal  Law  (1931)

References

External links
 

1897 births
1964 deaths
20th-century Bulgarian lawyers
Bulgarian emigrants to the United States